Quattordio (Quatòrdi in Piedmontese) is a comune (municipality) in the Province of Alessandria in the Italian region Piedmont, located about  southeast of Turin and about  west of Alessandria.

Quattordio borders the following municipalities: Castello di Annone, Cerro Tanaro, Felizzano, Masio, Refrancore, and Viarigi.
Despite its small population, the town has been, for more than 70 years, an important industrial site (particularly with regard to paint industry). The name derives from the Latin Quattuordecimum ("fourteenth"), indicating its distance from Asti.

References

Cities and towns in Piedmont